Sick joke may refer to:
Sick comedy
Black comedy
"Sick Joke", 1988 song by Doom from War Crimes (Inhuman Beings)
"Sick Joke", 2020 song by Neck Deep from All Distortions Are Intentional